Mary II (1662–1694) was Queen of England, Scotland and Ireland from 1689 until her death. 

Mary II may also refer to:
 Mary II, Countess of Menteith (XIV century)
 Maria II of Portugal (1819–1853), Mary II of Portugal
 Mary Polly Paaaina (c. 1833–1853), also known as Mary ʻĪʻī
 Queen Mary 2, an ocean liner that entered service in 2004
 Mary-2 airbase, a Soviet-era airbase used by the Turkmen Air Force

See also
 Queen Mary (disambiguation)